Robert James "Bob" Kevoian (born December 2, 1950) is a retired  American radio host of the nationally syndicated radio show The Bob & Tom Show together with his partner, Tom Griswold. The show is broadcast from WFBQ's studios in Indianapolis, Indiana.

Education
Kevoian is a 1973 graduate of California State University, Long Beach. With no formal training in radio, Kevoian had never set foot in a radio studio until his time at WBMN in Petoskey, Michigan, where he met future business partner Tom Griswold. Kevoian was awarded an honorary doctorate in Communications from Central Michigan University where he gave the commencement speech in 2003.

Entertainment career
After touring the U.S. for three years as sound engineer of The Young Americans, Kevoian began his radio career at WMBN in Petoskey, Michigan, in 1979. That lasted until 1982, when Kevoian joined cross-town WJML where Bob and Tom teamed up as a regular morning show. "We were there for 12 to 18 months," Kevoian recalls. The pairing of one of syndicated radio's most successful morning shows came when radio personality-by-day Kevoian moonlighted as a bartender at Harbor Springs, Michigan's Bar Harbor. "In small town radio, you needed to supplement your income by doing anything," the Long Beach State University alum states. "Tom came in after a J. Geils concert at Castle Farms in [nearby] Charlevoix and ordered a drink. At the end of the bar was another guy who worked in Country radio." The two radio talents were talking about the inferior nature of their respective stations’ cart machines. "Tom overheard us and asked if we worked in radio and I told him I was doing middays," Kevoian remembers. "Tom said he did a year of radio in Florida, but was out of work and wanted to visit the station and look at the trades. Two days later, he was hired as my PD; it was pretty wild." They achieved a 44 share in the ratings and in order to get rid of them the competition made a compilation tape of their best bits and mailed it to the Superstars Convention, a gathering of program directors from 300 stations, where it was played. They started getting offers from all over the country. He is the producer, director, writer and composed credits for The Bob and Tom Show Home Movie, 2004. Bob participated in the Bob and Tom Radio: The Comedy Tour shows recorded in Anderson, Indiana. Bob has personally produced over 15,000 "bits" used in his show, some of which are actually his original ideas.

Retirement
On November 5, 2015, after being inducted along with Tom Griswold into the National Radio Hall of Fame, Bob announced his retirement effective at the end of 2015. His last live show as co-host aired on December 17, 2015. On November 17, 2016 Bob and Tom were reunited when they were inducted into the Indiana Broadcasters Hall of Fame. Bob made his first post-retirement appearance as a guest host on April 3, 2017, when the show was in Cincinnati for the Cincinnati Reds home opener. Bob returned again on December 8, 2017, filling in for Tom Griswold. Bob returned March 30, 2018 and March 28, 2019 for the Cincinnati Reds opening day broadcast and again on May 24, 2019 for the Indianapolis 500 Bob and Tom Show. Bob returned once again on April 17, 2020 to the show.

On TV
The Bob and Tom Show aired nightly on WGN America and occasionally weekend best of airings until its cancellation in September 2010.

Personal life
Kevoian was born in Los Angeles, California, to John Hike "Toby" Kevoian and Jean Baker. On April 2, 2005, he married his current wife, Becky Martin. He has a son named Toby. Kevoian has stepsons named Wade and Joey. Kevoian is almost always seen wearing a Los Angeles Dodgers hat as a tribute to his father, who was a longtime employee of the Dodgers, but considers himself "a big Cincinnati Reds fan." Kevoian is an avid guitar player and has written some of the lyrics and music for the show's comedic parodies. Kevoian's brother-in-law (Becky's brother) is world-renowned tuba player Rex Martin. Kevoian's younger brother is actor Peter Kevoian. His mother was on Let's Make a Deal and won a Brunswick pool table, which she traded for cases of oyster stew. She retired from the Los Angeles County Office of Education in Downey, California. Kevoian also likes to collect "large" ordinary items, such as coffee cups or safety pins that are extremely large compared to their normal sizes. Kevoian likewise keeps a collection of these "large" items in his studio.

References

External links

 The Official Bob Kevoian and Tom Griswold Radio Show Website

 Bob Kevoian SoundCloud profile
 Inside Radio interview with Bob Kevoian

1950 births
California State University, Long Beach alumni
Living people
People from Indianapolis
Radio personalities from Los Angeles
American people of Armenian descent
The Young Americans members